Chrysocale ignita is a moth of the subfamily Arctiinae. It was described by Gottlieb August Wilhelm Herrich-Schäffer in 1853. It is found in Colombia.

References

Euchromiina
Moths described in 1853
Moths of South America
Endemic fauna of Colombia